Riemst is a small town and a municipality in the Belgian province of Limburg. Riemst is in the Flemish speaking area of Belgium.

On January 1, 2018 Riemst had a total population of 16,665. The total area is 57.88 km² which gives a population density of 276 inhabitants per km².

Riemst was the site of the Battle of Lauffeld, fought in 1747.

The bridge in the Borough Vroenhoven was part of the start of WW2, when the Germans launched a coordinated attack on the area.

Paul Schiepers (born in 1919) was the last mayor of the borough of Riemst before it joined with the other boroughs to form the current town of Riemst. He died on August 18, 1978.

Boroughs
Genoelselderen, Herderen, Kanne, Membruggen, Millen, Riemst, Val-Meer, Lafelt, Vlijtingen, Vroenhoven, Heukelom and Zichen-Zussen-Bolder

Gallery

References

External links

Official website - Available only in Dutch

Municipalities of Limburg (Belgium)